Ayacucho is a department of San Luis Province, Argentina.

With an area of  it borders to the east with the departments of Junín and San Martín, to the south with Coronel Pringles and Belgrano, to the west with the provinces of Mendoza and San Juan, and to the north with San Juan, La Rioja and Córdoba, which makes it the only department in Argentina which borders four provinces.

Municipalities 
 Candelaria
 La Majada
 Leandro N. Alem
 Luján
 Quines
 Río Juan Gómez
 San Francisco del Monte de Oro

Villages 
 Agro Candelaria
 Balde de Azcurra
 Balde de Puertas
 Balde de Quines
 Baldecito
 Barzola
 Bella Vista
 El Bañado
 El Cadillo
 El Chañar
 El Retamo
 El Vinagrillo
 El Zampal
 El Zapallar
 La Botija
 La Chañarienta
 La Leona
 La Selva
 La Tranca
 La Venecia
 Lomas Blancas
 Punta Negra
 San Ignacio
 San Roque
 San Vicente
 Santa Rosa de Cantantal
 La Candela
 La Aguada

References

Departments of San Luis Province